

Echinoderms

Research
 A study on the morphology of specimens of the blastoid species Deltoblastus batheri and Deltoblastus delta from the Permian of Timor, evaluating whether the differences indicative of niche differentiation could be detected, is published by Morgan (2018).
 A study on the morphological development of the primary large thecal plate in the widest part of the theca of Guizhoueocrinus yui is published online by Wang et al. (2018).
 Fatka, Nohejlová & Lefebvre (2018) interpret enigmatic Drumian echinoderm Lapillocystites fragilis as likely junior synonym of the edrioasteroid species Stromatocystites pentangularis.
 A study on the frequency of breakage and regeneration in the spines of the Middle Devonian camerate Gennaeocrinus and late Paleozoic cladids, as well as a survey of the prevalence of spinosity and infestation by platyceratid gastropods on crinoids during the Paleozoic, is published by Syverson et al. (2018).
 Brachial spines of pirasocrinid cladid crinoids displaying evidence for multiple episodes of breakage and regeneration are described from the Upper Pennsylvanian Ames Member of the Glenshaw Formation (Ohio, United States) by Thomka & Eddy (2018).
 A study on the morphology of arms of fossil and modern crinoids spanning from the Ordovician to the recent, evaluating whether known crinoid clades had more capacity to evolve morphological variation around the time of their origin than later in their evolutionary history, is published by Pimiento et al. (2018).
 A study on the changes of the body sizes of crinoids after the Late Devonian extinction is published by Brom, Salamon & Gorzelak (2018).
 A study on the phylogenetic relationships of disparid crinoids is published by Ausich (2018).
 A study on the microstructure of the stalk of the Triassic crinoid Holocrinus is published by Gorzelak (2018), who interprets his findings as indicating that Holocrinus was likely capable of stalk autotomy.
 A study on the occurrences of post-Paleozoic (Ladinian to Ypresian) crinoids from northeast Spain, on the main stratigraphic and sedimentological features of the sedimentary units that have yielded complete identifiable crinoids, and on their implications for reconstructing the environmental distribution of these crinoids, is published by Zamora et al. (2018).
 37 new Antarctic and Australian occurrences of Cenozoic isocrinid crinoids, representing nine different species in three genera, are reported by Whittle et al. (2018), who interpret their findings as indicating that isocrinid migration from shallow to deep water during the Mesozoic marine revolution did not occur at the same time all over the world.
 A study on the evolution of Paleozoic starfish is published by Blake (2018), who names new extinct orders Euaxosida, Hadrosida, and Kermasida, as well as new families Lacertasteridae, Permasteridae, and Illusioluididae.
 A study on the evolution of the species richness and morphological diversity of sea urchins in the Jurassic (Toarcian to Tithonian stages) is published by Boivin et al. (2018).

New taxa

References

2018 in paleontology
2010s in paleontology
2018 in science
2018-related lists
Lists of prehistoric echinoderms